Padmanabh Singh is the titular Maharajah of Jaipur. He is known as a noble and public figure in Jaipur as well as an established polo player.

Personal life 
Padmanabh Singh was born in New Delhi on 2nd July 1998 to Diya Kumari, an Indian politician, and her husband, Narendra Singh. He was educated at Mayo College in Ajmer and at Millfield, a public school in Street, Somerset, England. Since 2018, he has been enrolled in Università e Nobil Collegio Sant'Eligio in Rome, studying Cultural Heritage Management, Art History and Italian Language. He is known as Pacho by his loved ones and friends. Pacho was nick-named by his grandmother a.k.a Rajmata Padmini Devi.

Singh is the great-grandson of Man Singh II, the last ruling Maharaja of the princely state of Jaipur in the British Raj, though the relationship is not patrilineal. Singh's mother is the only daughter of the late Bhawani Singh, an Indian soldier, hotelier, and the son of Man Singh II.  His father is the son of a former member of staff of Bhawani Singh.  Singh's parents divorced in 2018.

Upon Bhawani Singh's death in 2011, the 12-year-old Padmanabh Singh was unofficially installed as the "Maharaja of Jaipur."  Although princely pensions, titles, and privileges were officially abolished in India in 1971, families of some former princely rulers have continued to use the old titles unofficially for certain family members or styled new ones for themselves. In some instances the titles are used for the purpose of officiating in family ceremonies and traditions; in others, they are thought to be used with a view to promoting the allure that princely India holds among tourists, and to sustaining the wealth, stardom, and clout that the families have retained. 

He has a younger sister Gauravi Kumari and a younger brother, Lakshraj Prakash Singh

Polo 
Padmanabh Singh began playing competitive polo in 2015 in England and has been a member of Guards Polo Club. In 2017, he led the Indian national team at Hurlingham Park in what was the first visit to the venue by an Indian team in over 70 years. His grandfather had led the last successful Indian polo tour of the UK.

References

1998 births
Living people
Mayo College alumni
People from Jaipur
People educated at Millfield
Polo players from Rajasthan